Carrillo Airport  is an airport serving Puerto Carrillo, a Pacific coastal village in Guanacaste Province, Costa Rica.

Facilities
The airport has a grass landing strip and a covered shelter that is occasionally used to weigh luggage before boarding. There are no amenities nearby. As of 2021, the airport has not been in use for several years and remains closed.

See also

 Transport in Costa Rica
 List of airports in Costa Rica

References

External links

Airports in Costa Rica
Buildings and structures in Guanacaste Province